The Treaty Oak is a Texas live oak tree in Austin, Texas, United States, and the last surviving member of the Council Oaks, a grove of 14 trees that served as a sacred meeting place for Comanche and Tonkawa tribes prior to European settlement of the area. Foresters estimate the Treaty Oak to be about 500 years old. The tree is located in Treaty Oak Park, on Baylor Street between 5th and 6th Streets, in Austin's West Line Historic District.

History and legends

Legends
A Native American legend holds that the Council Oaks were a location for the launching of war and peace parties. Legends also hold that women of the Tejas tribe would drink a tea made from honey and the acorns of the oaks to ensure the safety of warriors in battle.

According to popular local folklore, as well as the inscription on the plaque at the tree's base, in the 1830s early Texas pioneer Stephen F. Austin met local Native Americans in the grove to negotiate and sign Texas's first boundary treaty after two children and a local judge were killed in raids. No historical documentation exists to support this event actually taking place. Folklore also holds that Sam Houston rested beneath the Treaty Oak after his expulsion from the Governor's office at the start of Texas's involvement in the American Civil War.

History
As more and more European-Americans settled in Texas, the Council Oaks fell victim to neglect and the development of the city of Austin. By 1927 only one of the original 14 trees remained. The American Forestry Association proclaimed this tree the most perfect specimen of a North American tree, and inducted the Treaty Oak into its Hall of Fame in Washington, D.C.

Beginning in the 1880s, the tree was privately owned by the Caldwell family in Austin. Because she could no longer afford to pay property taxes on the land, in 1926 the widow of W.H. Caldwell offered the land for sale for $7,000. While local historical groups urged the Texas Legislature to buy the land, no funds were appropriated. In 1937, the City of Austin purchased the land for $1,000 and installed a plaque honoring the tree's role in Texas history.

Vandalism
In 1989, in an act of deliberate vandalism, the tree was poisoned with the powerful hardwood herbicide Velpar. Lab tests showed the quantity of herbicide used would have been sufficient to kill 100 trees. The incident sparked community outrage, national news reports, and a torrent of homemade "Get Well" cards from children that were displayed on the fence around the park. Texas industrialist Ross Perot wrote a blank check to fund efforts to save the tree. DuPont, the herbicide manufacturer, established a $10,000 reward to capture the poisoner. The vandal, Paul Cullen, was apprehended after reportedly bragging about poisoning the tree as a means of casting a spell. Cullen was convicted of felony criminal mischief and sentenced to serve nine years in prison.

The intensive efforts to save the Treaty Oak included applications of sugar to the root zone, replacement of soil around its roots and the installation of a system to mist the tree with spring water. Although arborists expected the tree to die, the Treaty Oak survived. Still, almost two-thirds of the tree died and more than half of its crown had to be pruned.

Today
In 1997, the Treaty Oak produced its first crop of acorns since the vandalism. City workers gathered and germinated the acorns, distributing the seedlings throughout Texas and other states. Today the tree is a thriving, though lopsided, reminder of its once-grand form. Many Texans see the Treaty Oak as a symbol of strength and endurance. In January 2009, the Texas chapter of the International Society of Arboriculture teamed up with the Austin Parks and Recreation Department to do maintenance pruning on the Treaty Oak.

See also
 List of individual trees

References

External links

Treaty Oak from About.com
The Treaty Oak in Austin, Texas

City of Austin Historic Landmarks
Individual oak trees
History of Austin, Texas
Comanche history
Tonkawa history
Individual trees in Texas